Nebojša Miličić (born 16 September 1959) is a Serbian football manager, who was lately assistant coach of Esteghlal, alongside manager Farhad Majidi.

Career statistics

Managerial statistics

References

1959 births
Living people
People from Zemun
Serbian football managers
FK Zemun managers